Vasil Dobrev may refer to:

 Vasil Dobrev (swimmer) (born 1947), Bulgarian swimmer
 Vasil Dobrev (footballer) (born 1998), Bulgarian footballer